Devon Graye Fleming is an American actor and filmmaker. He is best known for portraying teenage Dexter in the TV series Dexter, as well as the second Trickster in The Flash. In 2019, he wrote the horror film I See You.

Personal life

Graye was born in Mountain View, California. He studied acting at the American Conservatory Theater in San Francisco. Although Graye is American, he lived in the United Kingdom for all four years of high school. Graye wrote a thriller screenplay titled Allison Adams, which was featured on the 2016 Black List for most popular unproduced screenplays.

Graye is gay. He has been dating actor Jordan Gavaris since September 2013.

Filmography

References

External links
 

Living people
People from Mountain View, California
American male film actors
American male television actors
Male actors from California
American gay actors
LGBT people from California
21st-century LGBT people
Year of birth missing (living people)